Gullbrand Sjöström (born 6 October 1926) is a Swedish retired javelin thrower. He placed sixth at the 1954 European Championships and second-fifth at the national championships of 1953–57.

References

Swedish male javelin throwers
1926 births
Living people